Tricyanoaminopropene (TRIAP, TCAP, Malononitrile Dimer, 1,1,3-tricyano-2-amino-1-propene) is a nootropic drug which mimics the function of nerve growth factor and increases the growth of nerves and tissue regeneration both in isolated tissues and in vivo. It stimulates the action of the enzyme choline acetyltransferase, resulting in increased acetylcholine production. This then results in increased synthesis of RNA in many different tissues in the body. However it also suppresses the production of thyroxine, causing temporary hypothyroidism which returns to normal once the drug is discontinued.

Tricyanoaminopropene reduces the amnesia produced by electroconvulsive shock, and animal tests suggested nootropic activity, but no beneficial effect was found when it was tested in mentally disabled children, and administration to pregnant rats actually reduced learning ability in their young because of its anti-thyroid hormone effects. This drug thus produces two effects which oppose each other, with the nootropic effect from the increased acetylcholine production cancelled out by the opposite effect produced by the decrease in production of thyroxine. It is not known whether the efficacy of the drug could be improved by supplementation with additional thyroxine or equivalent drugs.

See also 
Coluracetam

References 

Abandoned drugs
Nootropics
Nitriles
Alkene derivatives
Amines